Zupan's Markets is a family-owned neighborhood gourmet grocer serving the Portland metro area with food and wine from local and global sources.   There are three markets: two located in Portland on W. Burnside Street and SW Macadam Avenue; one located in Lake Oswego on Boones Ferry Road.

History

At the age of 16, John Zupan  began work as a courtesy clerk at Sheridan Fruit. He spent subsequent years working in produce—logging 11 years at Fred Meyer as the Produce Manager and Produce District Manager—before founding his business in 1974.  Today Zupan's is run by John's son Mike, who has been President since 1994.  John, while semi-retired, remained involved in the company until his death in 2011.

Zupan's Markets has three locations in the Portland metropolitan area. A fourth store in the Belmont District of Portland was closed in January 2017.

Events

Zupan's Markets regularly hosts events, including wine and cheese tasting events in the Burnside Wine Cellar, and free Sip & Shop events take every Friday and Saturday night at each store.

Philanthropy

Charitable giving is a large part of the Zupan's business philosophy.  All proceeds from the Taste of Zupan's event, held each year, go to the Portland Police Bureau's Sunshine Division .  In 2009 the event, in partnership with The Sunshine Division, provided more than 500 food boxes to families in need.  Zupan's regularly works in partnership with the Portland Police Bureau's Project Ray of Hope to collect non-perishable foods for families.   The company has partnered with the Susan G. Komen Foundation, and in October 2009 donated hundreds of red apples to the American Heart Association's Go Red Luncheon .

References

External links
Zupan's Markets Website

Supermarkets of the United States
Companies based in Portland, Oregon
Retail companies established in 1974
1974 establishments in Oregon
Privately held companies based in Oregon
Family-owned companies of the United States